Juno Beach was an Allied landing site in France during the Second World War.

Juno Beach may also refer to:

 Juno Beach Centre, a museum located close to the Second World War landing site
 Juno Beach Academy of Canadian Studies, a school named in honour of the famous Second World War landing site
 Juno Beach, Florida, USA, a town in Palm Beach County

See also 
 Juno (disambiguation)
 Juneau (disambiguation)